This list of tallest buildings in Taipei ranks skyscrapers in the Taiwanese capital region of Greater Taipei by height, which includes the cities of Taipei City and New Taipei City, hereafter simply referred to as Taipei.

Currently, the tallest building in Taipei is the 101–story Taipei 101, which rises  and was completed in 2004. Taipei 101 was officially classified as the world's tallest from 2004 to 2010. Now, it is still the tallest building in Taiwan, Asia's 6th tallest building and the world's 10th tallest building.

There are currently several buildings over 200m under construction in Taipei, including the Taipei Twin Towers towers A and B, which are under planning and will reach  and  respectively, the Taipei Sky Tower, which is under construction in Xinyi District and will reach .

The tallest buildings are mostly concentrated in the modern central business districts of Xinyi Planning District, Banqiao District and Xinzhuang District as well as the traditional city centre of Zhongzheng District.

Panoramics

Tallest Buildings in Taipei

An equal sign (=) following a rank indicates the same height between two or more buildings. The "Year" column indicates the year of completion. The list includes only habitable buildings, as opposed to structures such as observation towers, radio masts, transmission towers and chimneys.

Tallest Buildings Proposed/ Under Construction

Timeline of tallest buildings

Skylines

See also
 Skyscraper
 List of tallest buildings
 List of tallest buildings in Taiwan
 List of tallest buildings in Taichung
 List of tallest buildings in Kaohsiung

References

External links
 Tallest buildings in Taipei on Emporis
 Tallest Buildings in Taipei on The Skyscraper Center
 Tallest Buildings in Taipei on SkyscraperPage

Taipei